Life on Marbs is a British semi-reality television series set in Marbella, Spain. The series follows the lives of the people who work and live in Marbs.

It is broadcast on ITVBe on July 22, 2015. Former The Only Way is Essex stars Ferne McCann and Elliot Wright have briefly appeared in the series

In March 2016, OK! Magazine exclusively revealed that they won't be coming back for a second series.

On 29 September 2016, Natalie appeared in the Channel 5 documentary Celebrity Botched Up Bodies to fix a previous nose job that went wrong.

Cast members

External links
 

2015 British television series debuts
2015 British television series endings
2010s British reality television series
2010s British television miniseries
British television spin-offs
English-language television shows
ITV reality television shows
Television series by All3Media
Television shows set in Spain